De Mazenod may refer to:

 Eugène de Mazenod (1782-1868), French Catholic clergyman
 De Mazenod College, a Catholic school in Kandana, Sri Lanka, managed by the De La Salle Brothers
 Colegio Eugenio de Mazenod, a private school in Col.Prados de la Montaña, Cuajimalpa, Mexico City